The Soong sisters, Soong Ai-ling, Soong Ching-ling, and Soong Mei-ling, were three sisters  from Wenchang city, Hainan Island of Hainan Province). Along with their husbands they became among China's most significant political figures of the early 20th century. Each sister, all educated as Christians, played a major role in influencing their husbands, leaders of Nationalist China: Sun Yat Sen, and Chiang Kai-shek, H. H. Kung, and, along with their own positions of power, ultimately changed the course of Chinese history.

Their father was American-educated Methodist minister Charlie Soong, who made a fortune in banking and printing. Their mother was Ni Kwei-tseng (倪桂珍 Ní Guìzhēn), also a Methodist who came from an Episcopalian family. All three sisters attended Wesleyan College in Macon, Georgia, United States. Mei-ling, however, left Wesleyan and eventually graduated from Wellesley College in Massachusetts. Their three brothers were all high-ranking officials in the Republic of China government, one of whom was T. V. Soong.

History

Throughout their lifetimes, each one of the sisters followed her own beliefs in terms of supporting the Kuomintang (KMT; Nationalists) or the Communists (CPC). In the 1930s, Soong Ai-ling and Mei-ling were the two richest women in China; both of them supported the Nationalists.

In 1937, when the Second Sino-Japanese war broke out, all three of them got together after a 10-year separation in an effort to unite the KMT and CPC against the Imperial Japanese army. Soong Ai-ling devoted herself to social work such as helping wounded soldiers, refugees and orphans. She donated five ambulances and 37 trucks to the army in Shanghai and the air force, along with 500 leather uniforms.

When the Japanese occupied Nanjing and Wuhan, the three sisters moved to Hong Kong. In 1940, they returned to Chongqing and established the Chinese Industrial Cooperatives, which opened job opportunities for people through weaving, sewing and other crafts. The sisters frequently visited schools, hospitals, orphanages, air raid shelters and aided war torn communities along the way.

Three sisters

Their marriages and alleged motivations have been summarized in the Mao Zedong saying "One loved money, one loved power, one loved her country" referring to Ai-ling, Mei-ling, and Ching-ling in that order.

Cultural materials
 The Soong Sisters, the award-winning 1997 Hong Kong film depicting the lives of the sisters
 The Soong Sisters, a 1941 book by Emily Hahn
 The Soong Dynasty, a 1985 book by Sterling Seagrave, 
 Big Sister, Little Sister, Red Sister, a 2019 book by Jung Chang,

See also
Four big families of the Republic of China
History of the Republic of China
Kuomintang

References

Bibliography
Soong Dynasty by Sterling Seagrave, Sidg. & J, 1985,

External links

Soong Sisters at the Wesleyan College website

Hainanese people
Sibling trios
Sisters
Political families of China
Soong Ching-ling